The Danish Albums Chart is a list of albums ranked by physical and digital sales in Denmark. It is compiled by Nielsen Music Control in association with the Danish branch of the International Federation of the Phonographic Industry (IFPI), and the new number-one album is announced every Thursday at midnight on the official Danish music charts website.

”Tracklisten” official chart for singles started on Week 43 / 2007 dated November 2, 2007, when it replaced the "Hitlisten" Single Top-20 and Download Top 20.

However, the "Tracklisten" was updated back to week 1, 2007 according to statistics kept, so for this period of 10 months (January to October 2007), we have two #1 singles listings: The Official "Hitlisten" charts" and the estimated Tracklisten with different #1 listed.

2000

2001

2002

2003

2004

2005

2006

2007

2008

2009

See also
List of number-one albums from the 2010s (Denmark)

External links
Hitlisten.NU - The official Danish music charts website (Archived version)
danishcharts.dk - Archive of the Danish music charts

Lists of number-one albums in Denmark
Denmark